Daminah refers to the following villages in the al-Qusayr District, Homs Governorate of Syria:
Daminah, Hama, a village in Syria's Hama Governorate
Daminah al-Gharbiyah, a village in Syria's Homs Governorate
Daminah al-Sharqiyah, a village in Syria's Homs Governorate